The Battle of Jaitpur was fought between the Maratha Empire under Peshwa Baji Rao I, on behalf of Chhatrasal Bundela, the ruler of Bundelkhand; and the Mughal empire under of Muhammad Khan Bangash in March 1729. Bangash attacked the state of Bundelkhand in December 1728. Being too old to fight, as well as heavily outnumbered, Chhatrasal appealed Baji Rao for assistance- under whose leadership the Maratha-Bundela alliance defeated Bangash at Jaitpur.

Background
In Bundelkhand, Chhatrasal had rebelled against the Mughal Empire and established an independent kingdom. In December 1728, a Mughal force led by Muhammad Khan Bangash attacked him and besieged his fort and family. Although Chhatrasal repeatedly sought Baji Rao's assistance, he was busy in Malwa at the time. He compared his dire situation to that of Gajendra Moksha. In his letter to Baji Rao, Chhatrasal wrote the following words:

Battle
In March 1729, the Peshwa responded to Chhatrasal's request and marched towards Bundelkhand with 25,000 horsemen and his lieutenants Pilaji Jadhav, Tukoji Pawar, Naro Shankar, Ramsingha and Davalji Somwanshi. Chhatrasal escaped capture and joined the Maratha force, increasing it to 70,000 men. After marching to Jaitpur, Baji Rao's forces surrounded Bangash and cut his supply and communication lines. Bangash launched a counterattack against Baji Rao, but could not pierce his defences. Qaim Khan, son of Muhammad Khan Bangash, learned of his father's predicament and approached with fresh troops. His army was attacked by Baji Rao's forces, and he was defeated. Bangash was later forced to leave, signing an agreement that "he would never attack Bundelkhand again".

Aftermath
Chhatrasal's position as ruler of Bundelkhand was restored. He granted a large jagir to Baji Rao, and gave him his daughter from a concubine named Ruhani Bai, Mastani. Before Chhatrasal's death in December 1731, he ceded one-third of his territories to the Marathas.

References

Military history of India
Bundelkhand
1729 in Asia
1729 in India
Bundelkhand
Bundelkhand